The women's 200m ind. medley SM10 event at the 2012 Summer Paralympics took place at the  London Aquatics Centre on 30 August. There were two heats; the swimmers with the eight fastest times advanced to the final.

Results

Heats
Competed from 11:24.

Heat 1

Heat 2

Final
Competed at 20:00.

 
'Q = qualified for final. WR = World Record. AS = Asian Record.

References
Official London 2012 Paralympics Results: Heats 
Official London 2012 Paralympics Results: Final 

Swimming at the 2012 Summer Paralympics
2012 in women's swimming